

Top-grossing films
The top-grossing films at the Indian Box Office in 
1987:

|-
| 7.
| Watan Ke Rakhwale
| Sunil Dutt  , Dharmendra, Mithun Chakraborty, Sridevi
|-
|}

1987 A-Z
A list of films produced by the Bollywood film industry based in Mumbai in 1987:

References

External links
 Bollywood films of 1987 at the Internet Movie Database
 Best Bollywood ringtones in mp3 plus Indian movie ringtones

1987
Lists of 1987 films by country or language
Films, Bollywood